Vidlič or Vidlich (Cyrillic: Видлич) is a mountain on the border of Serbia and Bulgaria, near the town of Pirot. Its highest peak Golemi vrh has an elevation of 1,413 meters above sea level.

References

Mountains of Serbia
Mountains of Bulgaria
Landforms of Blagoevgrad Province